Marojala  is a genus of moths of the family Erebidae. The genus was described by Viette in 1966. All the species are found on Madagascar.

Species
Marojala anophtalma (Viette, 1966)
Marojala butleri (Viette, 1966)
Marojala signata (Butler, 1880)

References

Calpinae